Franco Zennaro (born 1 April 1993) is a Belgian footballer who currently plays for Sprimont Comblain Sport.

External links
 Voetbal International profile 

Franco Zennaro at Footballdatabase

1993 births
Living people
Belgian footballers
Belgium youth international footballers
Belgium under-21 international footballers
Belgian expatriate footballers
Belgian Pro League players
Challenger Pro League players
Eerste Divisie players
Standard Liège players
S.K. Beveren players
Fortuna Sittard players
NK Istra 1961 players
K.S.V. Roeselare players
Expatriate footballers in the Netherlands
Expatriate footballers in Croatia
Belgian people of Italian descent
Footballers from Liège

Association football midfielders